Angèle Préville (born 23 November 1955 in Offenburg, Germany) is a French politician.

She is a member of the Socialist Party, and also is a Senator for Lot since 1 October 2017.

Biography 
Angèle Préville was a professor of physics and chemistry until June 2017, when she retired from the public service.

She later took part in various electoral campaigns for the candidates by campaigning door-to-door as an activist of the Socialist Party.

She was elected as the deputy mayor of Biars-sur-Cère in the 2014 municipal elections. For the 2015 departmental elections, she ran alongside Jean-Pierre Boucard in the canton of Cère et Ségala. They were elected in the second round with 72.26% of the votes.

She was a candidate for the 2017 senatorial elections with her deputy Alain Marty. She was elected Senator for Lot on 24 September 2017 with 190 votes, and became the first person from Lot to hold this position.

References 

French politicians
1955 births
Lot (department)
Living people